Lars Erik Lundberg (4 July 1920 - 2001) was a Swedish businessman, the founder of L E Lundbergföretagen.

Early life
Lars Erik Lundberg was born on 4 July 1920 in Norrköping. He received a bachelor's degree in civil engineering from the Stockholm Technical Institute.

Career
In 1944, Lundberg founded L E Lundbergföretagen in Norrköping, as a construction company, building residential property, but diversified into other areas over time.

Personal life
He died in 2001.

The company is now controlled by his son Fredrik Lundberg, and daughters Louise Lindh and Katarina Martinson, all billionaires.

References

1920 births
2001 deaths
Lundberg family
20th-century Swedish businesspeople